Devil Hunter may refer to:

Gabriel the Devil Hunter, a Marvel Comics superhero and exorcist
Devil Hunter (film), a 1980 West German horror film
Devil Hunters, a 1989 Hong Kong action film
Devil Hunter Yohko, a 1990 original video animation

See also
 Demon hunter (disambiguation)